Platyla polita is a species of very small land snail with an operculum, a terrestrial gastropod mollusk or micromollusk in the family Aciculidae. 

Subspecies
 Platyla polita polita (W. Hartmann, 1840)
 Platyla polita regina (Subai, 1977)

Distribution
This species is found in the Czech Republic, Slovakia, Poland, the Netherlands, Ukraine, in alluvial sediments of the Rhône River, France and others.

References 

 Reinhardt, O. (1880). Die Acme-Arten des Banats und Siebenbürgens. Sitzungs-Berichte der Gesellschaft Naturforschender Freunde zu Berlin, 1880 (2): 45-47. Berlin
 Wagner, A. J. (1928). Studien zur Molluskenfauna der Balkanhalbinsel mit besonderer Berücksichtigung Bulgariens und Thraziens, nebst monographischer Bearbeitung einzelner Gruppen. Prace Zoologiczne Polskiego Panstwowego Muzeum Przyrodniczego [Annales Zoologici Musei Polonici Historiae Naturalis]. 6 (4): 263-399, pl. 10-23. Warszawa.
 Paulucci, M. (1881). Descrizione di una nuova specie del génère Acme. Bullettino della Società Malacologica Italiana. 7: 221-225.

Platyla
Gastropods described in 1840